Raimund von Hofmannsthal (26 May 1906 – 20 March 1974) was an Austrian-born author and representative of an American newsreel firm in London.

Early life

Hofmannsthal was born 26 May 1906 in Austria. He was the youngest child of Gertrud "Gerty" Schlesinger, and Hugo von Hofmannsthal, an Austrian novelist, librettist, and dramatist, who settled in Rodaun (now part of Liesing). His sister, Christiane, married German indologist Heinrich Zimmer and they moved to New Rochelle, when he became a visiting lecturer at Columbia University. His father died of a heart attack in Vienna on 15 July 1929 as he was dressing for the funeral of Raimund's elder brother, Franz, who committed suicide at age 25 two days' prior. His mother died in London thirty years later in November 1959.

His paternal grandparents were the former Anna Maria Josefa Fohleutner, an upper-class Christian Austrian, and Hugo August Peter Hofmann, Edler von Hofmannsthal, a Christian Austrian–Italian bank manager. His great-great-grandfather, Isaak Löw Hofmann, Edler von Hofmannsthal, from whom his family inherited the noble title "Edler von Hofmannsthal", was a Jewish tobacco farmer who was made a member of the hereditary nobility by the Emperor of Austria in 1835. His mother, who converted to Christianity before their marriage, was the daughter of a Viennese Jewish banker.

Career
Hofmannsthal was an author who had written several magazine articles. In 1930, he was in Hollywood where he was associated with the United Artists and Paramount Studios and was one of the promoters of an enterprise in which Max Reinhardt and other well-known Continental artists and producers were active. By the late 1930s, he was a representative of an American newsreel firm in London. He belonged to the small, highly successful band of Austrians who made their name in Britain and in the United States--with his friend Sir George Weidenfeld probably the best known of all."

In 1937, Hofmannsthal hosted the Duke of Windsor (formerly King Edward VIII) and his wife, Wallis Simpson, the Duchess of Windsor, in the Austrian Tyrol, at their estate, Schloss Kammer on Lake Attersee near Salzburg. His family owned Schloss Prielau, a 17th-century chateau on the shores of the lake at Zell am See, which had been seized by the Nazis because of their Jewish ancestry, but was restituted in 1947.

Personal life

On 21 January 1933, von Hofmannsthal married Princess Obolensky, the former Ava Alice Muriel Astor (1902–1956), in the city court of Newark, New Jersey. Ava was the daughter of Col. John Jacob Astor IV (the wealthiest passenger to die in the sinking of the RMS Titanic) and, his first wife, Ava Lowle Willing (who married Thomas Lister, 4th Baron Ribblesdale in 1919). Although she was still married to her first husband, Prince Serge Obolensky (from whom she was divorced in December 1932), Hofmannsthal was said to be the father of their youngest child, Princess Sylvia Obolensky, who was born in May 1931. Before their divorce in 1939, they were the parents of another daughter:

 Romana von Hofmannsthal (1935–2014), who married Roderick McEwen, a son of Sir John McEwen, 1st Baronet, in 1958.

After his divorce, Hofmannsthal married Lady Elizabeth Hester Mary Paget (1916–1980) on 7 June 1939 at Chelsea, London. Lady Elizabeth was the second daughter of Charles Paget, 6th Marquess of Anglesey and Marjorie Paget, Marchioness of Anglesey (herself the eldest daughter of Henry Manners, 8th Duke of Rutland). Together, they were the parents of two children:

 Sarah Arabella Marjorie von Hofmannsthal (b. 1942), who married Baron Piers von Westenholz, son of Baron Henry von Westenholz and Marguerite Gordon Ness, in 1964. They divorced in 1969 and she married Michael FitzGerald Heathcoat-Amory, son of Maj. Edgar Heathcoat-Amory (a son of Ludovic Heathcoat-Amory and grandson of Sir John Heathcoat-Amory, 1st Baronet) and Sonia Myrtle Denison, in 1975. Michael's sister Amanda is the wife of Simon Cairns, 6th Earl Cairns.
 Octavian Charles Hugo von Hofmannsthal (b. 1946), who married Annabel Lea in 1977.Mosley, Charles, editor. Burke's Peerage, Baronetage & Knightage, 107th edition, 3 volumes. Wilmington, Delaware, U.S.A.: Burke's Peerage (Genealogical Books) Ltd, 2003, volume 1, page 102.

Hofmannsthal died in London on 20 March 1974. His funeral took place in Vienna.

Notes

References

External links
John Julius Norwich - Raimund von Hofmannsthal (128/136) at YouTube

1906 births
1974 deaths
Raimund